João Pontes Nogueira is an academic at the Pontifical Catholic University of Rio de Janeiro. He is an editor for the peer-reviewed English language academic journal, International Political Sociology. He has many published journal articles in Portuguese but few, if any, in English.

Selected bibliography

Journal articles

References

Year of birth missing (living people)
Living people
Academic staff of the Pontifical Catholic University of Rio de Janeiro